USS ATA-215 was an  of the United States Navy built near the end of World War II. Before completion, the name Paloverde was cancelled and the ship was named ATA-215, an unnamed auxiliary ocean tug. Post-war she was assigned to the Finn Ronne Antarctic Expedition where she became stuck in the ice for 12 months before returning to the United States for decommissioning.

Career 
Paloverde, originally designated YN–86, was laid down on 19 July 1943 as AN–65 by Snow Shipyards, Inc., Rockland, Maine; renamed and redesignated ATA–215 on 12 August 1944; launched 2 September 1944; sponsored by Miss Patricia Adams; and placed in service 17 December 1944.

ATA–215 was assigned to Service Squadron 2, U.S. Pacific Fleet. She proceeded to Norfolk, Virginia, where she arrived 2 January 1945. Then, getting underway for the U.S. West Coast, she transited the Panama Canal 19–20 February and arrived San Pedro, California, 19 March. She proceeded to Pearl Harbor on a towing assignment, arriving 26 March.

She remained at Pearl Harbor until departing for Eniwetok 11 May, and arrived at Leyte 18 June. On 28 June she proceeded back across the Pacific via Eniwetok for Pearl Harbor. In Pearl Harbor after the war, she was designated for disposal in March 1946.

Later in 1946, Congressional action provided ATA–215 to the Finn Ronne Antarctic Expedition on a loan basis. On 25 January 1947 Edith Ronne rechristened ATA-215 the Port of Beaumont, and the ship shoved off with 21 explorers for the Antarctic. She returned to New York City 15 months later after spending 12 months frozen in the ice pack of Marguerite Bay on the Palmer Peninsula.

She was struck from the Navy List December 1948 and was sold by the Navy 8 February 1949.

References 
  
 NavSource Online: YN-86 / AN-65 Palo Verde - ATA-215

 

ATA-214-class tugs
Ships built in Rockland, Maine
1944 ships
World War II auxiliary ships of the United States